Diphenidine (1,2-DEP, DPD, DND) is a dissociative anesthetic that has been sold as a designer drug. The synthesis of diphenidine was first reported in 1924, and employed a Bruylants reaction analogous to the one that would later be used to discover phencyclidine in 1956. Shortly after the 2013 UK ban on arylcyclohexylamines, diphenidine and the related compound methoxphenidine became available on the grey market. Anecdotal reports describe high doses of diphenidine producing "bizarre somatosensory phenomena and transient anterograde amnesia." Diphenidine and related diarylethylamines have been studied in vitro as treatments for neurotoxic injury and are antagonists of the NMDA receptor. In dogs diphenidine exhibits greater antitussive potency than codeine phosphate.

Electrophysiological analysis demonstrates that the amplitude of NMDA-mediated fEPSPs are reduced by diphenidine and ketamine to a similar extent, with diphenidine displaying a slower onset of antagonism. The two enantiomers of diphenidine differ greatly in their ability to block the NMDA receptor, with the more potent (S)-enantiomer possessing affinity forty times higher than the (R)-enantiomer. Since diphenidine's introduction in 2013 vendors have stated the drug "acts on dopamine transport" yet no data concerning the action of diphenidine on the dopamine transporter was published until 2016. Diphenidine's highest affinity is for the NMDA receptor, but it does display submicromolar affinity for the σ1 receptor, σ2 receptor and dopamine transporter.

Since 2014 there have been several published reports of diphenidine being sold in combination with other research chemicals, particularly synthetic cannabinoids and stimulants in Japanese herbal incense blends. The first reported seizure concerned a Japanese product called "fragrance powder" containing diphenidine and benzylpiperazine. A herbal incense sold in the Shizuoka Prefecture under the name "Aladdin  Edition" was found to contain diphenidine and 5F-AB-PINACA at concentrations of 289 mg/g and 55.5 mg/g, respectively. A product called ‘‘Herbal Incense. The Super Lemon’’ containing AB-CHMINACA, 5F-AMB, and diphenidine was implicated in a fatal poisoning. Most recently diphenidine consumed in conjunction with three substituted cathinones, three benzodiazepines, and alcohol was implicated in a fatal ingestion of "bath salt" and "liquid aroma" products in Japan.

In Canada, MT-45 and its analogues were made Schedule I controlled substances. Possession without legal authority can result in maximum seven years imprisonment. Further, Health Canada amended the Food and Drug Regulations in May, 2016 to classify DND as a restricted drug. Only those with a law enforcement agency, person with an exemption permit or institutions with Minister's authorization may possess the drug.

See also 
 AD-1211
 Ephenidine
 NPDPA
 Fluorolintane
 Lanicemine
 Lefetamine
 Methoxphenidine (MXP)
 MT-45
 Remacemide

References 

Designer drugs
Dissociative drugs
NMDA receptor antagonists
1-Piperidinyl compounds
Diarylethylamines